Huacas is a district of the Hojancha canton, in the Guanacaste province of Costa Rica.

History 
Huacas was created on 23 July 1999 by Decreto Ejecutivo 28027-G. Segregated from Hojancha.

Geography 
Huacas has an area of  km² and an elevation of  metres.

Villages
Administrative center of the district is the village of Huacas.

Other villages in the district are Avellana, Pita Rayada, Río Blanco Oeste and Tres Quebradas.

Demographics 

For the 2011 census, Huacas had a population of  inhabitants.

References 

Districts of Guanacaste Province
Populated places in Guanacaste Province